Susumaniello is a variety of red wine grape from the 'heel' of Italy. It is an ancient grape variety which is grown in the province of Brindisi in the southern  Italian region of Apulia.

Distribution and wines
Susumaniello is found only in the Italian region of Apulia. Until recently, the variety had fallen quite out of favour with viticulturalists; however, since 6 September 2003 it has been included in the list of varieties approved by the Apulian region for cultivation in the area of central Murgia. It is used as a blending grape in the production of both red and rosé wines such as the Negroamaro-based Brindisi Rosso and Brindisi Rosato and the Ottavianello-based Ostuni Ottavianello.

Vine and viticulture
Susumaniello needs a warm Mediterranean climate.

Origin
There are several theories about Susumaniello's origins, most of which suggest that it came to Puglia across the Adriatic, perhaps from Greece or the Dalmatian Coast of Croatia. DNA profiling shows that the variety is a natural cross between a Puglian table grape and the white-wine grape Garganega. Garganega was once thought to be of Greek origin (whence its southern Italian nickname Grecanico), which no doubt led some to the conclusion that Susumaniello was also Greek. According to one hypothesis, it should have come from Dalmatia (Croatia). The medium ripening vine is very productive, which is indicated by its name. You could pack a donkey with the many grapes. The saying "Susu lu somariello!" means "Run donkey!"

Synonyms
Cozzomaniello, Cuccipaniello, Grismaniello, Mondonico, Puledro, Somarello Nero, Susomaniello, Susomariello Nero, Sussumariello, Susumariello Nero, Uva Nera, Zingarello, Zingariello, Zuzomaniello.

See also
 Primitivo/Zinfandel

Notes and references

 regione.puglia.it Classificate nuove varietà di vite per la produzione dei vini pugliesi 
 politicheagricole.it Banca Dati Vini DOC, DOCG e IGT 

Footnotes

Further reading

External links
 VIVC Bibliography

Red wine grape varieties
Wine grapes of Italy
Wine grapes of Apulia